The 1997 Indianapolis Colts season was the 45th season for the team in the National Football League and 14th in Indianapolis. The Colts finished the National Football League’s 1997 season with a record of 3 wins and 13 losses, and finished fifth in the AFC East division. The Colts would start horribly, losing their first ten games for their worst start since 1986. They became only the second team to start 0–10 since 1987 after the 1993 Bengals, before an upset home win over eventual NFC Champion Green Bay. That would turn out to be the only good highlight all season for the Colts, as the team fell to a league-worst 3–13 record, and earned the first overall pick in the 1998 NFL Draft, where they selected quarterback Peyton Manning.

Offseason

NFL Draft

Personnel

Staff

Roster

Regular season

Schedule

Game summaries

Week 1 (Sunday, August 31, 1997): at Miami Dolphins

Week 2 (Sunday, September 7, 1997): vs. New England Patriots

Week 3 (Sunday, September 14, 1997): vs. Seattle Seahawks

Week 4 (Sunday, September 21, 1997): at Buffalo Bills

Week 5: Bye Week

Week 6 (Sunday, October 5, 1997): vs. New York Jets

Week 7 (Sunday, October 12, 1997): at Pittsburgh Steelers

Week 8 (Monday, October 20, 1997): vs. Buffalo Bills

Week 9 (Sunday, October 26, 1997): at San Diego Chargers

Week 10 (Sunday, November 2, 1997): vs. Tampa Bay Buccaneers

Week 11 (Sunday, November 9, 1997): vs. Cincinnati Bengals

Week 12 (Sunday, November 16, 1997): vs. Green Bay Packers

Week 13 (Sunday, November 23, 1997): at Detroit Lions

Week 14 (Sunday, November 30, 1997): at New England Patriots

Week 15 (Sunday, December 7, 1997): at New York Jets

Week 16 (Sunday, December 14, 1997): vs. Miami Dolphins

Week 17 (Sunday, December 21, 1997): at Minnesota Vikings

Standings

References

See also 
 History of the Indianapolis Colts
 Indianapolis Colts seasons
 Colts–Patriots rivalry

Indianapolis Colts
Indianapolis Colts seasons
Colts